Ithaa Oru Manushyan is a 1978 Indian Malayalam film,  directed by I. V. Sasi. The film stars Madhu, KP Ummer, Jayan, Sheela and Jayabharathi in the lead roles. The film has musical score by M. S. Viswanathan. The film was a remake of the Hindi film Amanush.

Cast
Madhu
K. P. Ummer
Jayan
Sheela
Jayabharathi
Bahadoor
Kanakadurga
Kuthiravattam Pappu
Poojappura Ravi as Kuttan Pilla, a police constable
Adoor Bhasi
Manjeri Chandran

Soundtrack
The music was composed by M. S. Viswanathan and the lyrics were written by Sreekumaran Thampi.

References

External links
 
 

1978 films
1970s Malayalam-language films
Films directed by I. V. Sasi
Films scored by M. S. Viswanathan
Malayalam remakes of Hindi films